John Rousmaniere is an American writer and author of 30 historical. technical, and instructional books on sailing, yachting history, New York history, business history, and the histories of clubs, businesses, and other organizations. An authority on seamanship and boating safety, he has conducted tests of equipment and sailing skills, and led or participated in fact-finding inquiries into boating accidents.  He has been presented with several awards for his writing and his contributions to boating safety and seamanship.

Early life and education
John Pierce Rousmaniere (pronounced "Room-an-ear") is the oldest of the eight children of the late James Ayer Rousmaniere, of Boston and New York, and of the late Jessie Broaddus Pierce Rousmaniere, of Louisville and Brownsville, Texas, the daughter of a U.S. Army general and a cousin of Mayor Andrew Broaddus, who integrated Louisville's parks in the 1950s. He is a descendant of a Frenchman who fought for the American side in the American Revolution, of the Easton family that co-founded Newport, Rhode Island, and of pioneer settlers in Brownsville, Texas. He spent his early years in Cincinnati, Ohio, and at age 11 moved with his family to Oyster Bay, on Long Island, New York. He is an alumnus of the Episcopalian-affiliated St. Paul's School, Concord, New Hampshire (1962); Columbia University (BS 1967, M.A. 1968); and Union Theological Seminary in the City of New York (M.Div., 1988).

Professional career
After U.S. Army service as an Infantry OCS-trained, Airborne-qualified officer and Assistant Professor of History at the U.S. Military Academy at West Point, Rousmaniere was an editor at Yachting and Natural History magazines before becoming a freelance writer in 1978. He worked in New York City and his home in Stamford, Conn., where he raised his two sons, before moving to Manhattan in 2005.

Rousmaniere writes on a wide range of topics but may be best known for his books on storms at sea, boating safety, yachting history, and sailing instruction. His sailing manual, The Annapolis Book of Seamanship (Simon & Schuster), has gone through four editions since its initial publication in 1983. The revised and updated fourth edition was published in January 2014. A video series of the same title is based on the book. Rousmeniere's Fastnet, Force 10 (W.W. Norton, 1980) is his first-person account of sailing in the tragic 1979 Fastnet Race, in which 15 sailors died. Published in several languages and still in print in 2016, this was the first of his two storm books. It was followed in 2002 by After the Storm: True Stories of Disaster and Recovery at Sea, about the causes and consequences of storms at sea as seen through biographies of sailors and seamen, stories of gales and wrecks, and Rousmaniere's own experiences. His experiences in and about the Fastnet Race storm led him to attend Union Theological Seminary, where he earned the Master of Divinity degree in 1988 and met his wife, Leath Ruth Robinson.

Rousmaniere has sailed more than 40,000 miles, including nine Newport Bermuda Races (two in the second-place boat), two Fastnet Races, three transatlantic races or cruises, other long races or cruises, and extensive day races that included winning championships. His sailing experience, and his writing about the 1979 Fastnet storm, led Rousmaniere to organize or participate in more than 100 safety at sea or seamanship events, including tests of equipment and studies of accidents, as well as safety-at-sea seminars under the aegis of the U.S. Sailing Association (US SAILING) or North U (the educational arm of North Sails). In 2010–16, he spoke at or moderated more than 20 safety seminars or related events: for the Transpac Race, Marion Bermuda Cruising Yacht Race, Isla Mujeres Race, U.S. Naval Academy Safety at Sea Seminar, Sailing Foundation in Seattle Safety at Sea Seminar, Chicago Strictly Sail Boat Show, Newport Bermuda Race, and other venues. He retired as a safety seminar moderator in 2016 and continues to make presentations, for example at the 2018 Newport Bermuda Race safety seminar.

Rousmaniere co-organized the Crew Overboard Rescue Seminar at Sausalito, Cal., in 2005 and wrote its final report recommending rescue equipment and skills. He later served as coordinator of the Hanson Rescue Medal Award presented by US SAILING.

In 2011 he served on Independent Review Panels in US Sailing Association inquiries into two fatal sailing accidents, one involving the death of a young sailor in a 420 dinghy at Annapolis, Md., and the other the deaths of two sailors in the Chicago Yacht Club's race to Mackinac Island, on Lake Michigan. The reports are available on the US Sailing website. In 2012 he conducted a review of an incident in the 2012 Newport Bermuda Race, and also wrote the report on tests of sailor retrieval, capsize recovery, and entrapment that were held in California and New York.

Rousmaniere has written a number of history books on a broad range of topics that include the America's Cup, ocean racing, yacht clubs and other clubs, New York history, business history, and the history of yachting.  He has also written about maritime photography (Sleek and A Picture History of the America's Cup). For many years he was Consulting Editor of The Dolphin Book Club, the maritime division of the Book of the Month Club. His book reviews have appeared in "WoodenBoat," "Cruising World", "Sea History," and other publications.

He frequently lectures on maritime history and New York history at historical associations, yacht clubs, and other venues. Beginning in 2012, he has led a monthly book discussion group concerning publications on maritime topics, meeting in the New York Yacht Club library.

His non-boating books include histories of the law firm of Davis Polk & Wardwell, the Equitable Life Assurance Society, the Union League Club of New York, and Piping Rock country club. Rousmaniere's writings about New York City include a history of settlement houses (his Columbia M.A. thesis).  His Green Oasis in Brooklyn is an illustrated history of a large, classic 170-year-old cemetery on the Brooklyn-Queens border. He contributed 40 essays to the 2nd edition (2010) edition of The Encyclopedia of New York City. He is a former trustee of The Evergreens Cemetery Preservation Foundation.

Books he has edited include  All This and Sailing, Too, the autobiography of the yacht designer Olin J. Stephens II, (Mystic Seaport, 1999);, as well as Dennis Conner's autobiography No Excuse to Lose; The Enduring Great Lakes, on the ecology of the Great Lakes; Desirable and Undesirable Characteristics of Offshore Yachts; and Michael Levitt, Herding Tigers: The North Sails Story (North Sails, 2009).

In television and video, Rousmaniere has written the scripts for several sailing shows produced by Gary Jobson for ESPN and other outlets. In 2002–03 he was the writer for the Outdoor Life Network's coverage of the Louis Vuitton Cup runup to the America's Cup match in Auckland, New Zealand. In 2007 he was a commentator on the America's Cup match at Valencia, Spain, on a Silversea Cruise Line ship. He has been interviewed for several historical documentaries and was co-writer of a documentary on the Beatles, The Compleat Beatles.

Rousmaniere was media chair for the 2010, 2012, 2014, and 2016 Newport Bermuda Races, writing and editing daily coverage of the race for its website, www.BermudaRace.com/, and for the international press.

He has written monthly columns on seamanship for Sailing World magazine and the online publication SailNet.  He contributes to Cruising World, Sail, Scuttlebutt, Sail World, and other web and print publications and has been interviewed on NPR and in print publications.

Encyclopedias to which he has contributed include The Oxford Encyclopedia of Maritime History, The Encyclopedia of Yacht Designers, The Oxford Companion to Ships and the Sea, and The Encyclopedia of New York City.

His memberships include the Century Association, Cruising Club of America, New York Yacht Club, Indian Harbor Yacht Club, and the Authors Guild.  He has chaired the New York Yacht Club's Library Committee and served on the Bermuda Race Organizing Committee, the Selection Committees of the National Sailing Hall of Fame and the America's Cup Hall of Fame, and the Safety at Sea Committees of the Cruising Club of America and U.S. Sailing. As a member of the executive committee of the U.S. Olympic Yachting Committee from 1977 to 1984, he chaired the 1980 Sailing Olympic Trials.

Besides teaching history at the U.S. Military Academy, Rousmaniere has taught writing at the College of New Rochelle, Union Theological Seminary, and the Davis Polk & Wardwell law firm.

Rousmaniere lives in Manhattan with his wife, Leah Ruth Robinson Rousmaniere, a development officer, mystery novelist, historian of tea, and the author of the history of the Seamen's Church Institute of New York and New Jersey.

Awards
In April 2009 the Cruising Club of America awarded John Rousmaniere its Richard S. Nye Trophy for meritorious service: "His books have been a source of information and inspiration to sailors around the world. He has also served the sport of sailing as a moderator at Safety at Sea Seminars, as a lecturer, and researcher on man overboard recovery techniques."

In October 2013 the United States Sailing Association (US Sailing) presented John Rousmaniere its Timothea Larr Award, which recognizes "a person whose vision and guidance have made an outstanding contribution to the advancement of sailor education in the United States." The citation highlighted his Annapolis Book of Seamanship and other books, the many safety and seamanship seminars and related events he has moderated or spoken at, and his reviews of boating accidents.

In January 2014 Mystic Seaport presented John Rousmaniere its W.P. Stephens Award, which recognizes "a significant and enduring contribution to the history, preservation, progress, understanding, or appreciation of American yachting and boating." Said Mystic Seaport President Steve White, "There are very few people with even a passing interest in boating or yachting who have not picked up a book written by John. His intuitive sense and passion for the subject matter makes sailing come alive on the page because he has lived that life."

In November 2014 the New York Yacht Club presented John Rousmaniere its first Henry H. Anderson Award for Volunteerism.

In March 2016 the Atlantic Class Association presented him its Annie Award in recognition of his book about the Atlantic.

Elected to the National Sailing Hall of Fame, June 2020  (Source:)

Publications

Books

1970s
1976 – A Glossary of Modern Sailing Terms. New York City: Dodd, Mead. .
1978 – Conner, Dennis, and John Rousmaniere. No Excuse to Lose: Winning Yacht Races with Dennis Conner. New York: Norton. .
1979 – The Enduring Great Lakes. John Rousmaniere, ed. New York: Norton. .

1980s
1980 – Fastnet, Force 10. New York: Norton. .
1981 – The Luxury Yachts. Alexandria, Va.: Time-Life Books. .
1983 – America's Cup Book, 1851–1983. New York: Norton. .
1983 – The Annapolis Book of Seamanship. New York: Simon & Schuster. .
1985 – The Sailing Lifestyle: A Guide to Sailing and Cruising for Pleasure. New York: Simon & Schuster. .
1986 – The Golden Pastime: A New History of Yachting. New York: Norton. .
1986 – The Low Black Schooner: Yacht America, 1851–1945: A New History of the Yacht America Based on the Exhibit Held at Mystic Seaport Museum, November 1986 through March 1987, Cosponsored by the New York Yacht Club. Mystic, Conn.: Mystic Seaport. .
1987 – Desirable and Undesirable Characteristics of Offshore Yachts. John Rousmaniere, ed. New York: Norton. .
1987 – The Norton Sailor's Log. New York: Norton. .
1989 – The Annapolis Book of Seamanship. 2nd rev. ed. New York: Simon & Schuster. .
1989 – A Glossary of Modern Sailing Terms. Rev. and updated. New York: Putnam. .
1989 – A Picture History of the America's Cup. New York: Norton. .

1990s
1991 – A Bridge to Dialogue: A Story of Jewish-Christian Relations. New York: Paulist Press. .
1995 – The Life and Times of the Equitable. New York: Equitable Companies, Inc. .
1997 – The Norton Boater's Log: An Innovative Log, Boat's Data Manual, & Guest Register: With Quick-reference Guides to Safety, Regulations, & Flag Etiquette. Rev. 2nd ed. New York: Norton. .
1998 – The Illustrated Dictionary of Boating Terms: 2,000 Essential Terms for Sailors & Powerboaters. New York: Norton. .
1999 – The Annapolis Book of Seamanship. 3rd rev. ed. New York: Simon & Schuster. .

2000s
2000 – Fastnet, Force 10 (with new introduction). New York: Norton. .
2001 – The Clubhouse at Sea. New York: New York Yacht Club. 
2002 – After the Storm: True Stories of Disaster and Recovery at Sea. Camden, Maine: International Marine/McGraw-Hill. .
2003 – Sleek: Classic Images from the Rosenfeld Collection. Mystic, Conn.: Mystic Seaport. .
2004 – Sailing at Fishers: A History of the Fishers Island Yacht Club. Mystic, Conn.: Mystic Seaport. .
2006 – A Berth to Bermuda: 100 Years of the World's Classic Ocean Race. Mystic, Conn.: Mystic Seaport and the Cruising Club of America. .
2006 – In a Class by Herself: The Yawl Bolero and the Passion for Craftsmanship. Mystic, Conn.: Mystic Seaport. .
2008 – Green Oasis in Brooklyn: The Evergreens Cemetery, 1849–2008. Kittery Point, Maine: Seapoint Books. .
2009 – The New York Yacht Club: A History, 1844–2008.
2011 – Piping Rock Club, 1911–2011. Wellington, Florida: Edgeworth Editions. .
2011 – History of the Shelter Island Yacht Club, 1886–2011. Kittery Point, Maine: Seapoint Books (limited edition).
2014 – The Annapolis Book of Seamanship. 4th edition. New York: Simon & Schuster.  
2014 – The Union League Club, 1863–2013. Kittery Point, Maine: Seapoint Books.
2014 – Indian Harbor Yacht Club, A History, 1889–2014. Kittery Point, Maine: Seapoint Books. 
2015 – The Great Atlantic, the First 85 Years. Kittery Point, Maine: Seapoint Books.

Articles
John Rousmaniere's articles and other shorter writing include the following:
1974 – Introduction, Alfred F. Loomis, Yachts Under Sail, revised edition (John de Graff, 1974).
1979 – "Two Days of Misery on the Toscana; Sailing Through Storm," The New York Times, August 16, 1979.
1985 – "Commodore J.P. Morgan." Nautical Quarterly, #31.
1987 – Introduction, Desirable and Undesirable Characteristics of Offshore Yachts (W.W. Norton, 1987).
1987 – Introduction, Llewellyn Howland, Sou'west and by West of Cape Cod (Yankee Books, 1987).
1989 – "Disaster Leads to Safety on the High Seas," The New York Times, August 6, 1989.
1989 – "Looking for the One Shot: An Interview with Stanley Rosenfeld," WoodenBoat #90, 1989.
1996 – Introduction, Tony Farrington, Rescue in the Pacific (International Marine, 1996).
1996 – Introduction, Donald C. Starr, The Schooner Pilgrim's Progress: A Voyage Around the World, 1932–1934 (Peabody Essex Museum, 1996).
2000 – "The America's Cup." American Heritage, Jan. 2000.
2000 – "Back from Bermuda." SailNet.
2000 – "KIRAWAN Redux," WoodenBoat #158.
2001 – "The Yacht AMERICA at 150," WoodenBoat #163.
2001 – "Yacht Racing Through Time: The America's Cup Jubilee," Sailing World, Nov. 2001.
2004 – "An East Coast Rite of Passage: The Newport Bermuda Race," Cruising World, Feb. 2004.
2004 – "Rousmaniere Remembers Fastnet," Cruising World, Aug. 2004.
2004 – "Olin Stephens on Yacht Restoration," WoodenBoat #179.
2004 – "Divine Lines: Sparkman & Stephens 75th Anniversary," Sail, Oct. 2004.
2004 – "Sleek: Classic Rosenfeld," Sailing World, Mar. 2004.
2005 – "America's Cup" and other essays, Oxford Companion to Ships and the Sea, 2nd edition (Oxford University Press, 2005).
2006 – "Rescue Aids: Overboard Recovery Devices," Practical Sailor, Jan. 2006.
2006 – "The Rediscovery of the Sea," Sea History, Summer 2006.
2006 – "The Nevins Yacht Yard," Maritime Life and Traditions, #31.
2006 – "Carleton Mitchell," Sail, Mar. 2006.
2006 – "Olin J. Stephens," "Bruce Kirby," "Kenneth S.M. Davidson," "George Steers," and five other essays, The Encyclopedia of Yacht Designers (Norton, 2006).
2006 – "The Birth of the Bermuda Race," WoodenBoat #190.
2007 – "Biblical Archetypes," "Yachting," "Cruising Literature," "America's Cup," and five other essays, The Oxford Encyclopedia of Maritime History (Oxford University Press, 2007).
2007 – Introduction, Rob Mundle, Fatal Storm (International Marine, 2007).
2007 – "Rousmaniere on Killer Storms at Sea,"  Ocean Navigator Online, March 27, 2007.
2007 – "100 Years of Thrashing to the Onion Patch." Newport Bermuda Race website.
2008 – "Formula for Disaster," "Heavy-Air Reminders," Safety at Sea: Official Program of the U.S. Sailing Safety at Sea Seminars.
2008 – "Olin J. Stephens." New York Yacht Club website.
2009 – "Australia II: John Rousmaniere Reflects on that Winged Keel." Sail World.
2009 – "Fastnet 30 Years Later," SailNet.
2010 – Media Team, 2010 Newport-Bermuda Race.
2010 – Sails and Nationality in America's Cup History (Declaration, Supreme Court of the State of New York).
2010 – Official Race Program, 2010 Newport Bermuda Race (editor and writer).
2010 – "Bermuda Race Wrapup" and many other postings. Newport Bermuda Race website. http://www.bermudarace.com.
2010 – Introduction, Benjamin Mendlowitz and Maynard Bray, The Book of Wooden Boats, vol. III (Norton, 2010).
2010 – "Geographical Features," "Cemeteries," "Sailing," "Marine Pollution," "Dylan Thomas," and 30 other essays. The Encyclopedia of New York City, 2nd edition (Yale University Press, 2010).
2010 – "The Old Girl's Ready to Dance Anew: Doted over by Maine Craftsmen and Devoted Owners During a 20-month Refit, the Sparkman & Stephens-designed yawl Bolero Is Savoring Her New Vitality," Cruising World (December 2010): 46–51. 
2011 – "Getting Started in Boats: Crew Overboard", WoodenBoat Nov.-Dec. 2011, #223.
2011 – Foreword, Patrick Goold (ed.), Sailing – Philosophy For Everyone: Catching the Drift of Why We Sail. Wiley-Blackwell, 2012.
2011 – Member, U.S. Sailing Association Independent Review Panels for two fatal sailing accidents: the death of a sailor at Annapolis, MD, in June 2011, and the deaths of two sailors during the Chicago Yacht Club Race to Mackinac.
2012 – "Tests of Sailor Retrieval, Capsize Recovery, and Entrapment,"
2012 – "Freaks or Takeaways: Lessons Learned from Recent Sailing Accidents," Sail (September 2012).
2012 – Review of Newport Bermuda Race incident in which a seasick sailor was taken off a racing boat by a cruise ship.
2013 – "A Seamanship Ethos," Cruising World (October 2013)
2013 – "Their Legends Live,"(schooner Nina)Yachting (October 2013)
2013 – "Sea History in a Brooklyn Cemetery," Sea History (Autumn 2013)
2013 – "Revisiting Lessons from the Fastnet"

Public speaking
Rousmaniere presents a dozen or more talks on sailing history and safe boating annually.
2010–12 – Moderator or speaker at U.S. Sailing Certified Safety at Sea Seminars in Pensacola, Chicago, Detroit, Toledo, Toronto, Newport Beach, New Orleans, Chicago, Seattle, Newport, New York, and Annapolis. History talks at the New Bedford (Ma.) Whaling Museum and other venues.
2012–16 – Moderator, monthly nautical book group, New York Yacht Club.
2013 – Moderator and main speaker at Marion-Bermuda Cruising Race Safety at Sea Seminar, Boston; at annual meetings of the American Schooner Association and the Junior Sailing Association of Long Island Sound; at safety clinics at Burlington VT, Nyack NY, and Oyster Bay NY Waterfront Center; and other events.
2013–16 – Speaker, New York City Parks Department Program on Cemeteries and Landscape Design, November 14, 2013. Moderator, book group: American writing about the sea and sailing. Speaker, Strictly Sail Boat Shows, Chicago, Jan. 24–26 (six seminars), and Newport Bermuda Race Safety at Sea Seminar, Newport, RI, Mar 15 and June 15, 2014, and March 19 and June 15, 2016

Film and videos
1982 – co-writer,The Compleat Beatles. ASIN 6301966376.
1987–88 – host and writer, The Annapolis Book of Seamanship: Volume One: Cruising Under Sail and four subsequent instructional videos in this series on sailing, plus a video on powerboat navigation.
2011 – host, Lifesling Training Video, The Sailing Foundation.
2011 – Report of Annapolis accident review, U.S. Sailing Association Annual Meeting, October 29, 2011.

Other
2005 – Emergencies on Board (Captain's Quick Guides). Camden, Maine: International Marine/Ragged Mountain Press. .
2005 – Heavy Weather Sailing (Captain's Quick Guides). Camden, Maine: International Marine/Ragged Mountain Press. .

References

External links
  John Rousmaniere's Amazon.com Profile.

1944 births
Living people
American magazine editors
American maritime historians
American people of French descent
American sailors
Maritime writers
Members of the New York Yacht Club
Military personnel from Louisville, Kentucky
North American Champions Soling
St. Paul's School (New Hampshire) alumni
Union Theological Seminary (New York City) alumni
United States Military Academy faculty
Writers from Louisville, Kentucky
Writers from Ohio